Frederick Plaskitt (24 December 1867 - 10 November 1926) was a British tennis player who played around the turn of the 20th century. He reached the men's singles quarterfinals at Wimbledon in 1900 (he beat Oswald Milne and Robert Hough before losing to losing to Arthur Gore). This was the only year he won a match in a Wimbledon singles career that lasted from 1896 to 1905.  Plaskitt was author of the book Microscopic fresh water life.

References

1867 births
1926 deaths
19th-century male tennis players
English male tennis players
British male tennis players
Tennis people from Lincolnshire